Sphinx sequoiae, the sequoia sphinx, is a moth of the family Sphingidae. It is found in the United States from Oregon south through California, Nevada, and south-eastern Utah to Arizona and further south into Mexico's northern Baja California.

The wingspan is 48–68 mm. There are two forms, a dark form (occurring from Oregon to central California) with blue-gray forewings with black dashes and a pale form (occurring in the juniper belt of the rest of the range) which is pale gray with only a faint blue tint.

There is a one generation per year with adults on wing from May to August. They feed on the nectar of various flowers, including Prunus virginiana var. demissa and Aesculus californica.

The larvae feed on Juniperus californica, Juniperus osteosperma and possibly also Calocedrus decurrens.

References

Sequoiae
Moths of North America
Lepidoptera of Mexico
Fauna of California
Fauna of the Northwestern United States
Fauna of the Baja California Peninsula
Fauna of the Great Basin
Fauna of the Sierra Nevada (United States)
Fauna of the California chaparral and woodlands
Natural history of Baja California
Natural history of the California Coast Ranges
Natural history of the Mojave Desert
Natural history of Nevada
Moths described in 1868